The 2020 LSU Tigers baseball team will represent Louisiana State University in the 2020 NCAA Division I baseball season. The Tigers will play their home games at Alex Box Stadium.

On March 11, the Southeastern Conference released a news statement announcing the restriction of fans at all SEC home spring athletic games, including baseball. On March 12, the Southeastern Conference released a new statement announcing the suspension of all athletics until as early as March 30. These announcements came after the COVID-19 pandemic has swept throughout the United States. On March 16, Louisiana governor John Bel Edwards announced the cancelation, closure, and postponements for facilities and events with more than 50 people until April 13, thus stopping all baseball games in the state of Louisiana until that date.

Previous season

The Tigers finished 40–26 overall, and 17–13 in the conference. The Tigers won the Baton Rouge Regional in the 2019 NCAA Division I baseball tournament before losing the Baton Rouge Super Regional to Florida State.

Preseason

SEC Coaches poll
The SEC coaches poll was released on February 6, 2020 with the Tigers predicted to finish tied for third in the Western Division.

Preseason All-SEC teams

First Team
Cade Beloso – First Baseman
Daniel Cabrera – Outfielder
Reference:

Personnel

Roster

Coaching staff

Schedule and results

Schedule Source:
*Rankings are based on the team's current ranking in the D1Baseball poll.

Rankings

2020 MLB draft

References

LSU
LSU Tigers baseball seasons
LSU Tigers baseball